Mackenzie Elizabeth Arnold (born 25 February 1994) is an Australian professional soccer player who plays as a goalkeeper for Women's Super League club West Ham United and the Australia women's national team. She previously played for Arna-Bjørnar in Norway's Toppserien as well as Brisbane Roar, Perth Glory, Western Sydney Wanderers, and Canberra United in Australia's W-League.

Early life 
Born on the Gold Coast, Arnold attended Palm Beach Currumbin High School.

Club career 
In 2012, Arnold joined Canberra United from Perth Glory ahead of the 2012–13 W-League.

Arnold joined Western Sydney Wanderers in 2013. However, she was later ruled out for a significant amount of the season after suffering a deep cut to the leg in the carpark following a match in the 2013 AFC U-19 Women's Championship.

Arnold returned to Perth Glory in August 2014.

Arnold was approached to switch codes and play Australian rules football in the newly formed AFL Women's in 2016, but chose to remain in soccer.

In October 2016, Brisbane Roar announced that they had signed Arnold.

In March 2018, she signed with Arna-Bjørnar in the Toppserien.

In July 2019, she played for the Chicago Red Stars, in the NWSL.

On 9 July 2020, Arnold signed for English club West Ham United of the FA Women's Super League. On 18 April 2021, Arnold was handed a surprise 20-minute cameo in midfield during an 11–0 win over Chichester & Selsey in the fourth round of the Women's FA Cup.

International career 
Arnold received her first call-up to the Australian national team for a tour of the United States in 2012. She made her debut in November that year, keeping a clean sheet in a win over Chinese Taipei in the 2013 EAFF Women's East Asian Cup preliminary round 2. She soon began to feature regularly in national squads in 2013, with previous incumbent goalkeepers Melissa Barbieri and Lydia Williams unavailable. Following their returns, Arnold was not included in the national setup for some time, before returning for the 2015 Cyprus Cup in March 2015.

Mackenzie was included as one of three goalkeepers in the Matildas squad for the 2015 FIFA Women's World Cup in Canada.

Arnold was selected in the Australia squad for the 2016 Summer Olympics as one of two goalkeepers in the squad along with Lydia Williams. She played one match in the tournament, a group stage win over Zimbabwe.

Arnold was named to the Matildas squad for the 2019 FIFA Women's World Cup in France.

Arnold was a member of the Matildas Tokyo 2020 Olympics squad. The Matildas qualified for the quarter-finals and beat Great Britain before being eliminated in the semi-final with Sweden. In the playoff for the Bronze medal they were beaten by the USA.

Career statistics

Club

International

Honours

International
Australia
 AFC Olympic Qualifying Tournament: 2016

Club
Brisbane Roar
 W-League Premiership: 2017–18

Perth Glory
 W-League Premiership: 2014

Individual
 W-League Goalkeeper of the Year: 2012–13, 2014 & 2017-18

See also
 List of Perth Glory FC W-League players
 List of Western Sydney Wanderers Women players
 List of foreign FA Women's Super League players

References

Further reading 
 Grainey, Timothy (2012), Beyond Bend It Like Beckham: The Global Phenomenon of Women's Soccer, University of Nebraska Press, 
 Stay, Shane (2019), The Women's World Cup 2019 Book: Everything You Need to Know About the Soccer World Cup, Books on Demand, 
 Theivam, Keiran and Jeff Kassouf (2019), The Making of the Women's World Cup: Defining stories from a sport’s coming of age, Little, 
 Various (2019), Stand Up for the Future, Penguin Random House, 
 Williams, Jean (2007), A Beautiful Game: International Perspectives on Women's Football , A&C Black, 
 Williams, Lydia (2019), Saved!, Allen & Unwin,

External links 
 
 

Living people
1994 births
Australian women's soccer players
Perth Glory FC (A-League Women) players
Canberra United FC players
Western Sydney Wanderers FC (A-League Women) players
Brisbane Roar FC (A-League Women) players
A-League Women players
2015 FIFA Women's World Cup players
Footballers at the 2016 Summer Olympics
Australia women's international soccer players
Women's association football goalkeepers
Olympic soccer players of Australia
Sportspeople from the Gold Coast, Queensland
Soccer players from Queensland
2019 FIFA Women's World Cup players
Australian expatriate sportspeople in England
West Ham United F.C. Women players
Footballers at the 2020 Summer Olympics
Australian expatriate sportspeople in Norway
Australian expatriate sportspeople in the United States
Australian expatriate women's soccer players
Expatriate women's soccer players in the United States
Expatriate women's footballers in Norway
Expatriate women's footballers in England